Motiongate Dubai (shortly known as Motiongate) is a Hollywood-inspired theme park located in Dubai Parks and Resorts, Dubai, United Arab Emirates, showcasing themed areas and attractions based on DreamWorks Animation, Columbia Pictures, Lionsgate, and The Smurfs and was opened on December 16, 2016.

History

MOTIONGATE Dubai is operated by Dubai Parks and Resorts. The park's opening date was originally scheduled on October 31, 2016, but was postponed due construction delays. It was opened on December 16, 2016.

Theme park operations were temporarily suspended in March 2020 due to COVID-19 precautionary measures. It was supposed to reopen on April 8, 2020 but the closure was extended for the summer period with the destination reopening on September 23, 2020. The company will "focus on the roll-out of the enhancement programme and completion of maintenance works during the closure period". On January 21, 2022, Lionsgate zone expanded to feature 2 additional movie franchises 'Now You See Me' and 'John Wick', also adding 2 rides to the park.

Areas
 Studio Central - a park's main entrance area with shopping and dining facilities, themed around Hollywood.
 Columbia Pictures - based on Sony Pictures' films and franchises such as Cloudy with a Chance of Meatballs, Hotel Transylvania, Ghostbusters, Zombieland, The Green Hornet, and Screen Gems' Underworld.
 DreamWorks - an indoor area that contains four sub-area all based on DreamWorks Animation franchises such as Shrek, Madagascar, Kung Fu Panda, and How to Train Your Dragon.
Shrek - highly themed area with a dark ride, and a flat ride for children.
Madagascar - based on Madagascar 3 and themed after a Circus, featuring a high-speed dark ride, an aircraft adventure, and a carousel ride. 
Kung Fu Panda - Chinese themed area featuring a 3D simulator and a flat ride.
How to Train Your Dragon - Viking area with a highly themed coaster adventure, and a swinging ride.
 The Smurfs' Village - themed to Peyo's The Smurfs, featuring a flat ride, and a rollercoaster.
 Lionsgate - based on Lionsgate films. It has only two rides based on The Hunger Games film adaptation franchise, Now You See Me film adaptation franchise, and John Wick film series.

Attractions

Columbia Pictures

Current
 Zombieland Blast-off - a drop tower.
 The Green Hornet: High Speed Chase - a Gerstlauer Bobsled roller coaster.
 Hotel Transylvania - a trackless dark ride.
 Underworld 4D - a 4D show. The following attraction contains depictions not suitable for children age 15 and under.
 Ghostbusters: Battle For New York - a 3D interactive shooting dark ride.
 Flint's Imagination Lab - an indoor interactive attraction aimed to younger guests age 12 and younger.
 Cloudy with a Chance of Meatballs: River Expedition - a river rapid-based water ride.

Former
 Ghostbuster Block Party - street show

DreamWorks
 Dragon Gliders - a powered inverted roller coaster created by Mack Rides.
 Shrek's Merry Fairy Tale Journey - a trackless dark ride
 Madagascar Mad Pursuit - a launched Gerstlauer Infinity coaster.
 Melman-Go-Round - Carousel created by Concept1900 Entertainment
 Lagaan carousel - Carousel created by Concept1900 Entertainment
 Penguin Air - a Zamperla Magic Bike.
 Swamp Celebration - a Disk'O.
 Kung Fu Panda Academy
 Mr. Ping's Noodle Fling - a teacup ride.
 King Julien's Side Show Stomp - a live show.
 Operation Penguin Shake
 Fountain of Dreams
 Kung Fu Panda: Unstoppable Awesomeness - a motion simulator supplied by Simworx, using their Cobra motion simulator technology. This attraction's plot and even voice lines would later be used in Universal Studios Hollywood's DreamWorks Theatre, albeit with lots of changes.
 The Swinging Viking - a pirate ship ride.
 Camp Viking

The Smurfs' Village
 Smurfberry Factory - a play area.
 Smurf Village Express - a Gerstlauer junior roller coaster.
 Smurfs Studio Tours  - a traditional dark ride.
 Woodland Play Park - an outdoor play area.
 Smurfs Village Playhouse - a live, animated interactive show.

Lionsgate
 Panem Aerial Tour - a motion simulator.
 Capitol Bullet Train - a Mack Rides launched coaster.
 John Wick: Open Contract - a S&S 4D Free Spin coaster.
 Now You See Me: High Roller - a  Maurer AG Spinning coaster.

Character appearances

Annual events
MOTIONGATE Dubai's Fright Nights (October 2018) - Held from the 18th of October until the 3rd of November, it featured 2 scare areas and a Saw themed maze.

MOTIONGATE Dubai's Fright Nights 2 (October 2019) - Held from the 24th of October until the 22nd of November. Horrors from the screen featured photobooth from famous horror movies in history. Haunting of the Old Graveyard was a storytelling show. Into the Deadlands was a maze themed after a post-apocalyptic Earth. Zombieland was a maze with zombies.

MOTIONGATE Dubai’s Fright Nights 3 (October 2020) - Held from the 22nd of October until the 14th of November. Guests can expect a live horror show performed at the Hollywood Theater which will feature a 20-minute chronicle around the grim story of The Collector and his epic fight with the Hollow Heart Beast. In addition, a horror maze right out of your worst nightmares awaits at The Underworld where you join a secret society formed by The Collector to capture an ancient creature that hides in the old cursed crypt. 

MOTIONGATE Dubai’s Fright Nights 4 (October 2021) – Held from 23rd of September until 6th of November. A haunted cinema infested by a creepy legend from the past lurking in the dark. Six guests will be allowed inside this immersive ‘Nyctophobia’ experience at a time, and they must figure their way out within six minutes. 

MOTIONGATE Dubai’s Fright Nights 5 (October 2022) – Held from 8th of October until 31st of October. The Legend of the Weeping Shadow scare zone investigates a vengeful ghost who is rumored to roam waterfront areas. Meanwhile, the Freak Show scare zone takes guests to the circus, where sideshow horrors and maniacal clowns roam around. The Halloween Fright Nights activities will end on a high note each day with The Nightmare Dimension Parade, where Halloween characters will walk through Studio Central, the main boulevard, just before park closing providing great photo opportunities for visitors and the potential to encounter the evil mastermind known as “The Boogeyman”. 

MOTIONGATE Dubai’s Festive Thrills (Annually) – Held during the month of December. The Middle East’s largest Hollywood-inspired theme park transforms into a winter wonderland, with a dazzling show of lights, park decorations, festive shows, a decked-up entrance gate, a mesmerizing 40-foot tree, a night market, the twinkling canopy on the main boulevard.

References

External links
 

Amusement parks in Dubai
Amusement parks in the United Arab Emirates
Amusement parks opened in 2016